Ikukwa is an administrative ward in the Mbeya Rural district of the Mbeya Region of Tanzania. In 2016 the Tanzania National Bureau of Statistics report there were 6,639 people in the ward, from 6,024 in 2012.

Villages and hamlets 
The ward has 2 villages, and 24 hamlets.

 Ikukwa 
 Ikukwa
 Itende Kati
 Itende juu
 Jua kali
 Kariakoo
 Kiwanja
 Mahonza
 Mbuwi
 Mdonya
 Shongo
 Ujamaa
 Ukwaheri
 Unguja
 Zongo
 Simboya
 Inyala
 Itombi
 Kulasini
 Magomeni
 Maji moto
 Manzese
 Ostabay
 Shokwa
 Simboya
 Wanga

References 

Wards of Mbeya Region